The 1970–71 Cypriot Cup was the 29th edition of the Cypriot Cup. A total of 16 clubs entered the competition. It began on 1 May 1971 with the first round and concluded on 6 June 1971 with the replay final which was held at GSE Stadium. Anorthosis Famagusta won their 5th Cypriot Cup trophy after beating Omonia 1–0 in the replay final.

Format 
In the 1970–71 Cypriot Cup, participated all the teams of the Cypriot First Division and 4 of 12 teams of the Cypriot Second Division (first four of the league table; cup took place after the end of the league).

The competition consisted of four knock-out rounds. In all rounds each tie was played as a single leg and was held at the home ground of the one of the two teams, according to the draw results. Each tie winner was qualifying to the next round. If a match was drawn, extra time was following. If extra time was drawn, there was a replay at the ground of the team who were away for the first game. If the rematch was also drawn, then extra time was following and if the match remained drawn after extra time the winner was decided by penalty shoot-out.

The cup winner secured a place in the 1971–72 European Cup Winners' Cup.

First round

Quarter-finals

Semi-finals

Final 

Because the match ended in a draw after the extra time, a replay match was played.

Sources

Bibliography

See also 
 Cypriot Cup
 1970–71 Cypriot First Division

Cypriot Cup seasons
1970–71 domestic association football cups
1970–71 in Cypriot football